William Jeffrey (born 25 October 1956) is a Scottish former footballer who played for Oxford United, Blackpool, Northampton Town and Kettering Town. During his spell at Oxford, he played 314 league games, and he is thirteenth highest in the overall list of appearances. After retirement, Jeffrey has been assistant manager twice, and has managed Irthlingborough Diamonds, Stamford, Rugby Town and Banbury United.

Blackpool
Jeffrey made his debut for Sam Ellis' Blackpool on 2 October 1982, in a 2–0 victory over Darlington at Bloomfield Road. He made thirteen further appearances in the Seasiders' 1982–83 campaign, the final one being on 12 March 1983, in another 2–0 home win, this time over Port Vale. He also scored one League goal, in a New Year's Day defeat at Hartlepool United. He appeared in both of the club's FA Cup ties – as a substitute against Horwich RMI in the First Round, and then in the starting line-up against arch-rivals Preston North End in the Second Round.

References

External links
Rage Online profile

1956 births
Scottish footballers
Association football midfielders
Northampton Town F.C. players
Oxford United F.C. players
Blackpool F.C. players
Kettering Town F.C. players
English Football League players
Irthlingborough Diamonds F.C. managers
Stamford A.F.C. managers
Rugby Town F.C. managers
Banbury United F.C. managers
Living people
Scottish football managers